El ruiseñor mexicano, (English: The Mexican mockingbird) is a Mexican telenovela produced by Televisa and originally transmitted by Telesistema Mexicano.

Cast 
 Ernestina Garfias as Ángela Peralta
 Enrique Rambal as Agustín Balderas "Ruiseñor mexicano"
 Antonio Passy as Don Manuel Peralta
 Carmen Molina as Josefa
 Oscar Pulido as Don Sebastián
 Enrique Aguilar as Eugenio Castera
 Enrique Becker as Manuel Peralta hijo
 María Douglas as Emperatriz Carlota Amalia
 Guillermo Zarur as Marqués de Colin
 Dina de Marco as Amalia
 Ana Margarita as Claudia Cardán

References

External links 
 

Mexican telenovelas
Televisa telenovelas
Spanish-language telenovelas
1969 telenovelas
1969 Mexican television series debuts
1969 Mexican television series endings